Al-Ḥārith ibn al-Ḥakam ibn Abī al-ʿĀṣ ibn Umayya was a senior adviser and cousin of Caliph Uthman. He played a role in the expedition against the Byzantines of North Africa in 647 and was later appointed supervisor of the market in the caliphal capital of Medina. A number of his descendants were active as estate holders and governors under their paternal kinsmen, the Umayyad caliphs, particularly the Marwanid house of al-Harith's brother Marwan I which ruled from 684 until 750.

Life
Al-Harith was a son of al-Hakam ibn Abi al-As and brother to Marwan I, the future Umayyad caliph. He was a paternal first cousin of Caliph Uthman. Under Uthman, al-Harith and Marwan played influential roles as the caliph's top counsels. 

According to al-Baladhuri, in 647 (or 648 or 649) the caliph put al-Harith at the head of an army to reinforce his governor of Egypt, Abd Allah ibn Abi Sarh, who upon the reinforcements' arrival, assumed overall command and led the Muslim forces on campaign against the Exarchate of Africa (Byzantine-controlled North Africa).

Uthman appointed al-Harith to supervise the market of Medina, then the capital of the Caliphate. This caused consternation among the Ansar (natives of Medina) who considered it an encroachment of their control in their native city. Reports in the early Islamic tradition mentioned a particular incident that aroused Ansarite hostility, namely that al-Harith used his post to purchase goods and sell them in the market at considerable profit. Protests lodged to the caliph in response were dismissed and the Ansar became further angered when Uthman awarded al-Harith a gift of camels collected as sadaqa (alms tax). Uthman had previously angered members of the community, particularly Abu Dharr al-Ghifari, when he awarded al-Harith a huge sum of money from the tribute collected during the military campaigns in Byzantine North Africa. He also gave al-Harith an estate at al-Manzur, in the vicinity of Medina.

Descendants
A son of al-Harith, Abd al-Wahid, held an estate called Marj Abd al-Wahid after him in Syria, the metropolitan province of the Umayyad Caliphate. He invested in it, turning the meadow into pasture grounds for Muslim use for which he was praised in verse by the poet al-Qatami. 

Al-Harith's grandson, Sa'id ibn Abd al-Aziz, commonly and derogatorily known as Sa'id Khudhayna (khudhayna was a term used by the Arabs to refer to the wives of Iranian nobles and essentially meant 'little princess') was the governor Khurasan in 720 under his father-in-law Maslama ibn Abd al-Malik, a grandson of Marwan I. Another of al-Harith's grandsons, Khalid ibn Abd al-Malik, served as the governor of Medina for Caliph Hisham ibn Abd al-Malik, grandson of Marwan. Khalid's brother Isma'il was married to Hammada, a daughter of Hasan ibn Hasan, a grandson of Caliph Ali, and he had two sons with her.

References

Bibliography

7th-century Arabs
Banu Umayya
People from the Rashidun Caliphate
Arab people of the Arab–Byzantine wars
Exarchate of Africa